Bali is a name, which may refer to:

Given name
 Bali Ram Bhagat (1922–2011), Indian politician
 Bali Rai (born 1971), English author

Surname
 Arun Bali, Indian actor
 Domkat Bali (b. 1940), Nigerian retired Army general and politician
 G. S. Bali (born 1954), Indian politician
 Geeta Bali (1930–1965), Bollywood actress
 Hanif Bali (born 1987), Swedish politician
 Nimai Bali, Indian actor
 Péter Bali (born 1984), Hungarian football player
 Rajeshwar Bali (1889–1944), Indian monarch
 Rowena Bali (born 1977), Mexican writer
 Suchindra Bali (born 1976), Tamil actor
 Yogeeta Bali (born 1952), Hindi actress

Indian surnames
Indian masculine given names